Fintan Magee is an Australian street artist known for his murals throughout Australia and the world. Born in Lismore, New South Wales, he grew up in Brisbane, gaining a reputation as a graffiti writer before obtaining a fine arts degree and relocating to Sydney.

Work
 

He has been described as "Australia's Banksy" by a number of media outlets although Magee has stated in various interviews that he hates this and has stated it is a result of "lazy journalism".

His work often deals with environmental issues. In 2015 his solo show at Backwoods Gallery in Melbourne was themed around his own personal experiences in the 2011 Brisbane floods. He often uses personal stories to talk about broader issues like climate change and the migrant crisis.

He received national acclaim for his mural depicting Felix Baumgartner in Brisbane, and has participated in various public art festivals in Australia and abroad. Along with other recognised street artists from around Australia, Magee contributed to Toowoomba's "First Coat" program.

Family background
Fintan has Irish, English and Australian ancestry, his father is from Derry in Northern Ireland and his mother is English born. His maternal grandfather, who was from Woollahra in Sydney, had an architectural practice in Ghana, West Africa.

References

Further reading
"Inside the magical world of Australia's 'Banksy' ", The Daily Telegraph Sydney, 25 March 2014
"From Westend to Comparisons with Banksy", Brisbane Times, 24 March 2014
 http://www.streetartbio.com/single-post/2016/04/20/Galleria-Varsi-presents-Fintan-Magee

External links 

 
 
 Google Map of Fintan Magee murals in Sydney Australia

Australian artists
Year of birth missing (living people)
Living people
People educated at Brisbane State High School
People from Lismore, New South Wales